the H-Invitational Database (H-InvDB) is a comprehensive annotation resource for human genes and transcripts.

See also
 Genes

References

External links
 http://www.h-invitational.jp/

Biological databases